Cameron Marquise Jani Smith (born December 21, 2000) is an American football cornerback for the South Carolina Gamecocks.

High school career
Smith attended Meade Senior High School in Fort Meade, Maryland, before transferring before his senior year to Westwood High School in Blythewood, South Carolina. He was selected to play in the 2019 All-American Bowl. He committed to the University of South Carolina to play college football.

College career
Smith played in three games as a true freshman at South Carolina in 2019 and had three tackles. As a redshirt freshman in 2020, he started three of eight games and had 16 tackles and two interceptions. In 2021, he played in 11 games with seven starts, recording 41 tackles and three interceptions.

References

External links
South Carolina Gamecocks bio

2000 births
Living people
People from Blythewood, South Carolina
Players of American football from South Carolina
American football cornerbacks
South Carolina Gamecocks football players